Chudley-Mccullough syndrome is a rare genetic disorder which is characterized by bilateral congenital (sometimes progressive) hearing loss associated with brain malformations. It is a type of syndromic deafness.

Presentation 

People with this disorder usually show the following symptoms:

 Bilateral sensorineural hearing loss
 Hydrocephalus
 Partial absence of the corpus callosum
 Colpocephaly
 Medial frontal polymicrogyria
 Frontal subcortical heteropia

In some people with the disorder, arachnoid cysts, facial dysmorphisms, seizures and psycho-motor developmental delays (specific development spectrum disorders and intellectual disabilities) is found.

Etimology 

This condition is associated with the GPSM2 gene.

Cases 
What follows is a list of all cases of Chudley-Mccullough syndrome recorded in medical literature.

1997: Chudley et al. discovers the disorder by publishing the first case of the syndrome; they describe a brother and a sister born to second-cousin Canadian-Mennonite parents, both of the siblings showed hydrocephalus (caused by obstruction of the foramen of Monro and severe bilateral hearing loss. This case is then thought to be a brand new (novel) syndrome which is inherited in an autosomal recessive manner (due to both biological sexes being affected, absence of any intrauterine infections and the consanguineous parents being apparently healthy).
1999: Y M Hendriks et al. describes two sisters (the youngest being 3 years old and the oldest being 10) with arachnoid cysts, congenital hearing loss, partial corpus callosum agenesis, and hydrocephalus. Their parents weren't consanguineous, however; they did come from the same isolated small-scale village.
2000: E G Lemire et al. describes two Mennonite sisters with the disorder; The younger sister had congenital bilateral hearing loss and hydrocephalus due to obstruction of the foramen of Munro. She was found to have mutations in the FMR1 gene. The older sister had gray matter heterotopia, cortical dysplasia, dysgenesis of the corpus callosum and cerebellum, and congenital bilateral hearing loss, however; the hearing loss wasn't caused by an obstructed Munro foramen like her sister.
2003: Katherine Oelrich Welch et al. describes three siblings (more specifically: two brothers and one sister) with hearing loss, hydrocephalus, asymmetric dilatation of the lateral ventricles, arachnoid cysts, corpus callosum partial agenesis, and cerebellar cell migration anomalies.
2004: Elsebet Østergaard et al. describes two siblings (more specifically, brothers) born to seemingly healthy, consanguineous Pakistani parents, both siblings had severe bilateral hearing loss and corpus callosum agenesis associated with other brain structure abnormalities.
2006: Fabio Matteucci et al. describes two Italian sisters born to non-consanguineous healthy parents, both of the sisters had hydrocephalus-induced macrocephaly, hearing loss, brain structure abnormalities, psycho-motor delays, and minor facial dysmorphia.
2010: Hashem Shahin et al. and Tom Walsh et al. described 7 affected members from a large consanguineous Palestinian family. Those individuals had severe congenital hearing loss.
2011: Ismail Alrashdi et al. describes a 9-year-old girl born to consanguineous Lebanese parents, with infancy-onset hearing loss, hypoplasia of the inferior cerebellar vermis and corpus callosum, frontal parasagittal polymicrogyria, subcortical gray matter heterotopia, and cisterna magna enlargement. She didn't have foramen obstruction or abnormal psycho-motor development.
2012: K O Yariz et al. describes a consanguineous Turkish family in which 3 members (all children) presented with congenital bilateral hearing loss and no other abnormalities, the 3 children had mutations in the GPSM2 gene. Doherty et al. later did brain MRIs on this family and the Palestinian family previously reported and found that 1 of the affected members of the Palestinian family and all of the Turkish children had the brain abnormalities that are required for a diagnosis of Chudley-Mccullough syndrome. 
2012: Dan Doherty et al. describes 12 affected members from 8 families (including the first reported family with the disorder) with Chudley-McCullough syndrome, five out of the eight families were of Mennonite descent. All of the patients had severe bilateral hearing loss and brain structure anomalies. Two of the patients had manageable seizures and one had an intellectual disability, it's severity was in between mild and moderate.

References 

Rare genetic syndromes
Syndromes affecting hearing
Syndromes affecting the nervous system